This is a list of the extant and extinct (†) species in the genus Formica which includes wood ants, mound ants, & field ants.

Valid Formica species

Synonyms

A number of described species have been synonymized into other species as jr synonyms 
 Formica cinerea - Senior synonym of Formica balcanica Petrov & Collingwood, 1993, Formica imitans Ruzsky, 1902, Formica lefrancoisi Bondroit, 1918, and Formica subrufoides Forel, 1913
 †Formica flori - Senior synonym to †Formica antiqua Dlussky, 1967, †Formica baltica Dlussky, 1967, †Formica egecomerta Özdikmen, 2010, and †Formica parvula Dlussky, 2002
 Formica foreli  - Senior synonym to Formica goesswaldi Kutter, 1967, Formica naefi Kutter, 1957, and Formica tamarae Dlussky, 1964
 Formica forsslundi - Senior synonym to Formica brunneonitida Dlussky, 1964, Formica fossilabris Dlussky, 1965, and Formica nemoralis Dlussky, 1964
 †Lasius globularis - Senior synonym to †Formica capito Heer, 1867
 Formica manchu - Senior synonym to Formica dlusskyi Bolton, 1995
 Formica pallidefulva - Senior synonym to Formica nitidiventris Emery, 1893, Formica schaufussi Mayr, 1866, and Formica succinea Wheeler, 1904
 †Formica phaethusa - Senior synonym to †Formica clymene Wheeler, 1915
 Formica ravida  - Senior synonym to Formica haemorrhoidalis Creighton, 1940 and Formica rufa tahoensis Creighton, 1940
 †Formica ungeri - Senior synonym to †Formica acuminata Heer, 1849, †Formica aemula Heer, 1867, †Formica kollari Heer, 1867, and †Formica oblita Heer, 1867
 Formica pressilabris - Senior synonym to Formica rufomaculata Ruzsky, 1895 & Formica tamarae Dlussky, 1964
 Formica selysi - Senior synonym to Formica torrentium Bernard, 1967

Moved

Some species were originally described as species of Formica, but later moved to different genera
 †Formica atavina Heer, 1849 - current combination †Ponerites atavinus
 †Formica gracilis Heer, 1867 - current combination †Ponerites gracilior
 †Formica longiventris Heer, 1850 - current combination †Casaleia longiventris 
 †Formica macrocephala Heer, 1850 - current combination †Lasius ophthalmicus
 †Formica ocella Heer, 1850 - current combination †Emplastus ocellus
 †Formica ophthalmica Heer, 1850 - current combination †Lasius ophthalmicus
 †Formica pumila Heer, 1850 - current combination †Lasius occultatus
 Formica subrufa Roger, 1859 - current combination Iberoformica subrufa

Unidentifiable
A number of species described in the genus have subsequently been determined as unidentifiable to the genus

Miscellaneous
 Formica fuliginothorax Blacker, 1992 is considered an unavailable name, due to the type description not designating any type specimens.

References

Formica